Atsaysky datsan "Tubden Darzhaling" is one of the oldest Buddhist Gelug monasteries in Buryatia, which operated from 1743 to 1935.

History 

In 1743, in the north-east side of Goose Lake, in the mouth of the river Zagustay Selenge Buryats, put the temple arc represent a felt yurt.

The first shireete (superiors) are Lama, who arrived from Tibet.

Later wooden Tsogchen arc was built, with the Tibetan name Tubden Darzhaling.

In the 1930s during the anti-religious persecution lamas were persecuted, and he was eliminated datsan decision.

By 1945, all the buildings of the complex were demolished.

Revival 

In 2012-2014, the Palace complex erected White Tara.

The temple-Dugan conducted daily services.

External links 
 Ацайский дацан
 Глубокая вера. На дне озера в Бурятии ищут древний буддийский храм

Buildings and structures built in the Soviet Union
Buddhist monasteries in Russia
Gelug monasteries
Buildings and structures in Buryatia
Buddhism in the Soviet Union
Demolished buildings and structures in Russia